The measures of the old Romanian system varied greatly not only between the three Romanian states (Wallachia, Moldavia, Transylvania), but sometimes also inside the same country. The origin of some of the measures are the Latin (such as iugăr unit), Slavic (such as vadră unit), Greek (such as dram unit) and Turkish (such as palmac unit) systems.

This system is no longer in wide use since the adoption of the metric system in 1864, however some rural communities still use a small subset of these units.

Length
 Palmă (palm) -  1/8 of a stânjen
 Stânjen -  2 m (approximately)
 Palmac -  3.48 cm (Moldavia)
 Poștă -  8–20 km (depending on the country)
 Pas mic (small step) -  4 palme (Wallachia) (palme is the plural noun for palmă)
 Pas mare (large step) -  6 palme (Wallachia; Moldavia)
 Lat de palmă (palm width) -  1/2 palmă
 Cot (cubit) -  664 mm (Moldavia); 637 mm (Wallachia)
 Funie (rope) -  20–120 m (depending on the place)
 Leghe (league) -  4.444 km; 
 Deget (finger) –  the width of a finger
 Prăjină –  3 stânjeni (stânjeni is the plural noun for stânjen)
 Verstă –  1067 m (3,500 ft)
 Picior (foot) –  1/6 of a stânjen

Volume
Note: the "quarts" in this table are imperial quarts, not US quarts. Similarly for gallons.
{|  class="wikitable"
!colspan=1|Unit 
!colspan=1|Value in Moldavia
!Value in Wallachia
! colspan="1" |Value in Transylvania
|-
| Oca   
| 1.5 litres; 1.32 quarts
|1.25 litres; 1.1 quarts
| –
|- 
| Litră 
| 0.25 litres; 0.22 quarts 
|0.25 litres; 0.22 quarts
| 0.25 litres; 0.22 quarts
|- 
| Baniță
| 21.5 litres; 18.3 quarts 
|33.96 litres; 29.9 quarts
| –
|-
| Chiup   
| colspan="3" | 30–40 litres; 26–35 quarts  
|- 
| Câblă
| colspan="3" | unknown
|-
| Merță
| 110–120 litres; 97–106 quarts
| –
| 22.5 litres; 20 quarts
|-
| Ferdelă/Felderă 
| colspan="3" | 20 litres
|-
| Obroc mare 
| 66 litres; 58 quarts
|55 litres; 48 quarts
| –
|-
| Obroc mic| 33 litres; 29 quarts
|27.5 litres; 24 quarts
| –
|-
| Giumătate 
| colspan="3" | 1200–1500 litres; 264-330 gallons
|-
| Vadră 
| 15 litres; 13 quarts
|12.88 litres; 11 quarts
| –
|-
| Pintă 
| – 
| –
| 3.394 litres; 2.988 quarts
|-
| Tină 
| –
| –
| 15 litres; 13 quarts
|-
| Sau 
| 3.22–3.80 millilitres; 0.11–0.13 fluid ounces
| –
| –
|}

Weight

Area

See also
 Historical weights and measures
 SI
 Weights and measures

NotesIugăr – the area ploughed in one day by two oxen – 7166 m2 (Transylvania in 1517); 5,700 m² (in other states)Stânjen pătrat'' – Embracing square

References 

 Nicolae, Stoicescu: Cum măsurau strămoşii, metrologia medievală pe teritoriul româniei, Editura Ştiinţifică, București, 1971.

Systems of units
Units of length
Units of area
Units of volume
Units of mass
Units of measurement by country